Spiraeanthemum katakata is a species of plant in the family Cunoniaceae. It is endemic to Fiji.

References

Endemic flora of Fiji
katakata
Least concern plants
Taxonomy articles created by Polbot